The Chatti (also Chatthi or Catti) were an ancient Germanic tribe whose homeland was near the upper Weser (Visurgis), whose name might mean "pursuers". They lived in central and northern Hesse and southern Lower Saxony, along the upper reaches of that river and in the valleys and mountains of the Eder and Fulda regions, a district approximately corresponding to Hesse-Kassel, though probably somewhat more extensive. They settled within the region in the first century BC. According to Tacitus, the Batavians and Cananefates of his time, tribes living within the Roman Empire, were descended from part of the Chatti, who left their homeland after an internal quarrel drove them out, to take up new lands at the mouth of the Rhine.

Proto-history
The extremely large timescale of Prehistoric Europe left stone tools and weapons dating from the Paleolithic to the Iron Age that were chronologically ordered and dated in the nineteenth and twentieth centuries. Tribes such as the Chatti, Cimbri, and Langobardi have not been well distinguished until relatively recently.

Sources
While Julius Caesar (100–44 BC) was well informed about the regions and tribes on the eastern banks of the Rhine, he never mentioned the Chatti by name. He did make note of the Suebi though, and suggested that they had previously driven out the Celts to the south of the region corresponding to modern north Hesse in the prior centuries BC (cfr. the early medieval Hessengau). Pliny the Elder, in his Natural History (written 77–79 AD) grouped the Chatti and Suebi together with the Hermunduri and the Cherusci, calling this group the Hermiones, which is a nation of Germanic tribes mentioned by Tacitus as living in inland Germany. Some commentators believe that Caesar's Suebi were possibly the later Chatti, a branch of the Suebian movement of people who had become more clearly identifiable. If not, then the Chatti may represent a successful resistance to the Suevi, as opposed to the Tencteri, Usipetes, and Ubii who all were forced from homelands in the same region by the Suebic incursions.

The first ancient writer to mention the chats is Velleius Paterculus. He mentioned the Chattas in 6 AD in his book 2, 109 (5): “Sentius Saturninus received the order to march with his legions through the area of the Chatten to Boiohaemum, that's the name of the area in which Marbod lives and should he will cut a breach through the impenetrable Hercynian Forests.
The second ancient writer to mention the Chatti is Strabo, some time after 16 AD, who includes the Chatti in a listing of conquered Germanic tribes who were more settled and agricultural, but also poorer, than the nomadic tribes in central and eastern Germania such as the Suebi. They were poor because they had fought the Romans, and had been defeated and plundered. In his second book of Epigrams, Martial credited the emperor Domitian (51–96 AD) as having overcome the Chatti:

For the first century AD, Tacitus provides important information about the Chatti's part in the Germanic wars and certain elements of their culture. He says that:[The Chatti's] settlements begin at the Hercynian forest, where the country is not so open and marshy as in the other cantons into which Germany stretches. They are found where there are hills, and with them grow less frequent, for the Hercynian forest keeps close till it has seen the last of its native Chatti. Hardy frames, close-knit limbs, fierce countenances, and a peculiarly vigorous courage, mark the tribe. For Germans, they have much intelligence and sagacity; they promote their picked men to power, and obey those whom they promote; they keep their ranks, note their opportunities, check their impulses, portion out the day, intrench themselves by night, regard fortune as a doubtful, valour as an unfailing, resource; and what is most unusual, and only given to systematic discipline, they rely more on the general than on the army. Their whole strength is in their infantry, which, in addition to its arms, is laden with iron tools and provisions. Other tribes you see going to battle, the Chatti to a campaign. Seldom do they engage in mere raids and casual encounters. It is indeed the peculiarity of a cavalry force quickly to win and as quickly to yield a victory. Fleetness and timidity go together; deliberateness is more akin to steady courage.

Tacitus also notes that like other Germanic tribes, the Chatti took an interest in traditions concerning haircuts and beards.A practice, rare among the other German tribes, and simply characteristic of individual prowess, has become general among the Chatti, of letting the hair and beard grow as soon as they have attained manhood, and not till they have slain a foe laying aside that peculiar aspect which devotes and pledges them to valour. Over the spoiled and bleeding enemy they show their faces once more; then, and not till then, proclaiming that they have discharged the obligations of their birth, and proved themselves worthy of their country and of their parents. The coward and the unwarlike remain unshorn. The bravest of them also wear an iron ring (which otherwise is a mark of disgrace among the people) until they have released themselves by the slaughter of a foe. Most of the Chatti delight in these fashions. Even hoary-headed men are distinguished by them, and are thus conspicuous alike to enemies and to fellow-countrymen. To begin the battle always rests with them; they form the first line, an unusual spectacle. Nor even in peace do they assume a more civilised aspect. They have no home or land or occupation; they are supported by whomsoever they visit, as lavish of the property of others as they are regardless of their own, till at length the feebleness of age makes them unequal to so stern a valour.

Between the Rhine and the Chatti, Tacitus places the Tencteres and Usipetes, who apparently had been moved since the time of Caesar into the old homeland of the Ubii, who had in turn settled in Cologne. (Caesar had described these three tribes as under pressure from Suebi to their east, and attempting to move across the Rhine.) To the south, Tacitus also says that the Chatti's land is beyond the questionable lands, the so-called tithe lands, or agri decumates, that adventurers from the Roman sides of the Rhine and Danube had been trying to settle. It is possible that at first the Chatti moved into place on the Rhine, in the old territory of the Ubii. Cassius Dio describes Drusus establishing a fort in Chatti territory on the Rhine in 11 BC, and that in 10 BC they moved out of an area where the Romans had permitted them.

To the north of the Chatti, Tacitus places the large area of the Chauci. To the east, the neighbours of the Chatti and Chauci were the Cherusci, who Tacitus describes as excessively peace-loving in his time. (Caesar had described the Suevi, not the Chatti, as living between the Ubii on the Rhine and a forest called the Bacenis, which separated them from the Cherusci. This is why Caesar's Suevi are sometimes thought to be Chatti.)

The Chatti successfully resisted incorporation into the Roman Empire, joining the Cheruscan war leader Arminius' coalition of tribes that annihilated Varus' legions in 9 AD in the Battle of the Teutoburg Forest. Germanicus later, in 15, raided their lands in revenge, but Rome eventually responded to the Chatti's belligerent defense of their independence by building the limes border fortifications along the southern boundary of their lands in central Hesse during the early years of the first century. A major raid by the Chatti into Germania Superior was defeated decisively by the legions in 50 AD. In 58 AD the Chatti were defeated by the Hermunduri in a border dispute over a religiously significant river.

Roman sources identify the fabled Mattium, beyond the Eder, as the capital of the Chatti.  Destroyed by Germanicus, its location is not known today, but generally is assumed to be in the wider neighbourhood of Fritzlar north of the river Eder.

The Chatti were opponents of the emperor Domitian in 84 CE, and were allies of Lucius Antonius Saturninus in his revolt of 89 CE.

They appear again during the build up to the Marcomannic wars, first attacking southwards towards Germania superior and Raitia in what is now southern Germany, in 162, and then while the bigger battles were being fought they were repulsed together with the Hermunduri from the Rhine by Didius Julianus in 175.

After the early third century AD, however, the Chatti virtually disappear from the sources and are only called upon as a topical element or when writing about events of the first century. Cassius Dio is most likely not only the first author to mention the Alamanni but also the last one to record a historical appearance of the Chatti. Writing about the Germanic war of Caracalla in 213 AD, he has the emperor fight "Κέννους, Kελτικòν ἔθνος" ("the Kenni, a Celtic people"). This is taken from an excerpt of Dio in the writings of Joannes Xiphilinus, however, whereas the Fragmenta Valesiana refer to the same people as "Chattoi". The usage of "Kελτικός" for Germanic peoples was an archaic tradition among Greek writers.

After Cassius Dio, the name "Chattus" appears among others in a panegyric by Sidonius Apollinaris in the late fifth century, now as a poetic synonym for "Germanus". The last ancient source to mention the Chatti, if only in a quotation of Sulpicius Alexander describing events of the late fourth century, was Gregory of Tours.

Allegedly the Chatti were associated with the legendary "First King of the Franks". The story is told of the election of the first Frankish king. The much later Liber Historiæ Francorum says that after the death of Sunno, his brother Marcomer, leader of the Ampsivarii and Chatti, proposed to the Franks that they should have one single king, contrary to their tradition. The Liber adds that Pharamond, named as Marcomer's son, was chosen as this first king (thus beginning the tradition of long-haired kings of the Franks), and then states that when he died, his son Chlodio [428 AD] was raised up as the next king. The work says no more of him.

The Chatti eventually may in any case have become a branch of the much larger neighboring Franks and their region was incorporated in the kingdom of Clovis I, probably with the Ripuarians, at the beginning of the sixth century.

The Chatti name is apparently preserved in the medieval and modern name of Hesse in Germany, which is a name that already appears early. In 723 for example, the Anglo-Saxon missionary Winfrid—subsequently called St. Boniface, Apostle of the Germans—proselytizing among the Hessians (Hessorum), felled their sacred tree, Thor's Oak, near Fritzlar, as part of his efforts to convert them and other Germanic tribes to Christianity.

Chasuarii and Chattuarii
Two tribes in northern Germany have names that are sometimes compared to the Chatti. The Chattuarii, whose name appears to mean that they are dwellers upon the Chatti lands, or else Chatti people, lived near the Rhine, probably between IJssel and Lippe. They came to be seen as Franks and apparently moved over the Rhine as a Frankish people, to settle into the corner of land between the Rhine and Maas rivers.

The name of the Chattuarii is in turn, sometimes compared to another people called the Chasuarii mentioned by several classical authors. The Chasuarii were a Germanic tribe mentioned by Tacitus in the Germania. According to him, they dwelt to the north of the Chamavi and Angrivarii, who dwelt in turn to the north of the Bructeri, between Ems and Weser, however the name of the Chasuarii most often is interpreted to mean "dwellers on the Hase [river]", a tributary to the Ems. The second century geographer Claudius Ptolemy mentions that the Kasouarioi lived to the east of the Abnoba mountains, in the vicinity of Hesse, but this account of northern Europe is thought to contain confusions derived from using different sources.

Places named after the Chatti 
 Hesse: probably derived from "Chatti" through the High German consonant shifts.
 Kassel: derived from the ancient Castellum Cattorum, a castle of the Chatti
 Katwijk: from Chatti and Dutch wijk, "village/settlement"
 Katzenelnbogen: historians speculated that the name derives from *Cattimelibocus, a combination of two words: the Chatti and Melibokus, from Μηλίβοκον (Mēlíbokon), the name of a mountain range in Ptolemy's Geography which has been (probably incorrectly) identified with the Malchen.  
 Mont des Cats

In popular culture
 The Light Bearer (1994), a historical novel by Donna Gillespie.
 Mark of the Lion Series (1993), a series of historical fiction novels by Francine Rivers.
 Barbarians (2020), one of the tribes that unites against the Romans prior to the Battle of the Teutoburg Forest.

See also
Adgandestrius
Mattiaci
Batavi
 In geology, the Chattian Age of the Oligocene Epoch is named after the Chatti
List of Germanic peoples
 Woman of the Chatti

Notes

External links
 

 
Early Germanic peoples
Irminones